Charles B. Kornmann (born September 14, 1937) is a senior United States district judge of the United States District Court for the District of South Dakota.

Early life, education, and career
Born in Watertown, South Dakota. Kornmann graduated from Castlewood High School in Castlewood , South Dakota. Kornmann then received a Bachelor of Arts degree from College of St. Thomas in 1959 and a Bachelor of Laws from Georgetown University Law Center in 1962.

He was in the South Dakota National Guard from 1963 to 1972 and the United States Army from 1968 to 1972. He became a captain. He was a Legislative assistant to U.S. Senator George McGovern in 1963. Kornmann was an Executive secretary of South Dakota Democratic Party from 1963 to 1965.

He was in private practice in Aberdeen, South Dakota from 1965 to 1995, also working as an assistant city attorney for the City of Aberdeen from 1970 to 1986.

Federal judicial service

On January 23, 1995, Kornmann was nominated by President Bill Clinton to a seat on the United States District Court for the District of South Dakota vacated by John Bailey Jones. Kornmann was confirmed by the United States Senate on March 24, 1995, and received his commission the same day. He assumed senior status on July 31, 2008.

References

Sources

1937 births
Living people
Judges of the United States District Court for the District of South Dakota
United States district court judges appointed by Bill Clinton
United States Army officers
People from Watertown, South Dakota
University of St. Thomas (Minnesota) alumni
Georgetown University Law Center alumni
People from Aberdeen, South Dakota
South Dakota Democrats
20th-century American judges
21st-century American judges
South Dakota National Guard personnel